Lyocyclidae is a taxonomic family of small sea snails, unassigned in the order Caenogastropoda

Genera
 Lyocyclus Thiele, 1925
 Nescitus Rubio & Rolán, 2021

References

 Thiele J. (1925). Gastropoden der Deutschen Tiefsee-Expedition. II Teil. Wissenschaftliche Ergebnisse der Deutschen Tiefsee-Expedition auf dem Dampfer "Valdivia" 1898–1899. 17(2): 35-382, pls 13-46
 Bouchet P., Rocroi J.P., Hausdorf B., Kaim A., Kano Y., Nützel A., Parkhaev P., Schrödl M. & Strong E.E. (2017). Revised classification, nomenclator and typification of gastropod and monoplacophoran families. Malacologia. 61(1-2): 1-526

Caenogastropoda
Lyocyclidae
Gastropod families